Andy Isabella (born November 18, 1996) is an American football wide receiver for the Baltimore Ravens of the National Football League (NFL). He played college football at Massachusetts, and was selected by the Arizona Cardinals in the second round of the 2019 NFL Draft.

Early years
Isabella attended Mayfield High School in Mayfield, Ohio. Isabella ran track in high school. In his senior year of high school, Isabella won the state title in the 100-meter dash, beating fellow sprinter and future Cleveland Browns cornerback Denzel Ward in a close race. He committed to the University of Massachusetts to play college football. Isabella is of Italian heritage.

College career
Isabella played at UMass from 2015 to 2018. Initially recruited as a running back, he converted to wide receiver his sophomore year. During his career he had 231 receptions for 3,526 yards and 30 touchdowns. As a senior, he was an All-American and was a finalist for the Fred Biletnikoff Award.

In 2018, he led the country in receiving yards per game (141.5) and was named to the 2018 College Football All-America Team. Isabella was Pro Football Focus's highest rated wide receiver in college football, posting a season grade of 93.2.

College statistics

Professional career 

Isabella declared for the 2019 NFL Draft after his senior season. At the combine, Isabella ran a 4.31 second 40 yard dash, which was the third fastest time at that year's combine, tied with Ohio State wide receiver Parris Campbell.

Arizona Cardinals
Isabella was drafted by the Arizona Cardinals with the 62nd overall pick in the second round of the draft. The Cardinals acquired this selection in a trade that sent Josh Rosen to the Miami Dolphins.
In Week 9 against the San Francisco 49ers, Isabella caught one pass for an 88-yard touchdown in the 28-25 loss.  This was Isabella's first career receiving touchdown in the NFL. He finished his rookie season with nine receptions for 189 receiving yards and one receiving touchdown.

In Week 3 of the 2020 season, Isabella recorded four receptions for 47 receiving yards and two touchdowns in the 26–23 loss to the Detroit Lions.

Isabella entered the 2021 season sixth on the Cardinals wide receiver depth chart, and only had one catch the entire season and was inactive for half the season.

On October 4, 2022, the Cardinals waived Isabella.

Baltimore Ravens
On October 10, 2022, Isabella signed with the Baltimore Ravens' practice squad. On December 31, 2022, Isabella was elevated to Baltimore's active roster for Week 17 versus the Pittsburgh Steelers. On January 2, 2023, Isabella was put back on Baltimore's practice squad after a thigh injury versus Pittsburgh. On January 14, 2023, Isabella was elevated to Baltimore's active roster again for their playoff game versus the Cincinnati Bengals.  He signed a reserve/future contract on January 19, 2023.

NFL career statistics

Regular season

References

External links
 Sports Reference (college)
Arizona Cardinals bio
UMass Minutemen bio

1996 births
Living people
All-American college football players
American football wide receivers
Arizona Cardinals players
Baltimore Ravens players
Players of American football from Ohio
Sportspeople from Cuyahoga County, Ohio
UMass Minutemen football players